The 1406 papal conclave (November 18–30), the papal conclave of the time of the Great Western Schism, convened after the death of Pope Innocent VII. It elected Cardinal Angelo Correr, who under the name of Gregory XII became the fourth pope of the Roman Obedience.

Cardinal electors

Pope Innocent VII died on November 6, 1406. At the time of his death, there were eighteen cardinals in the Roman Obedience of the College of Cardinals. Fourteen of them participated in the election of his successor:

All the electors were Italians, except of Jean Gilles, who was French. Four of them were elevated by Urban VI, two by Boniface IX, and eight by Innocent VII.

Absentee cardinals

Four cardinals, one created by Urban VI, one by Boniface IX and two by Innocent VII, did not participate in this conclave:

The election of Pope Gregory XII

Fourteen cardinals present in Rome entered the conclave in Vatican on November 18, twelve days after the death of Innocent VII.

Initially, all the electors subscribed the conclave capitulation, in which each of them swore that, if elected, he would abdicate provided Antipope Benedict XIII did the same or should die; also, that he would not create new cardinals except to maintain parity of members with the Avignon cardinals; and that within three months he would enter into negotiations with his rival about a place of meeting.

Almost no further details about this conclave are known, except of its final result. On November 30 Cardinal Angelo Correr, proposed by Cardinal Caetani, was unanimously elected Pope, in spite of his very advanced age (probably ca. 80). He accepted his election and took the name of Gregory XII. Although he claimed the legality of his pontificate, nine years later he abdicated in the Council of Constance, making possible to restore the unity of the Roman Catholic Church.

Notes

External links
 List of participants of the Papal conclave, 1406
 Vatican History: Konklave 1406 (in German)

1406
15th-century Catholicism
Western Schism
15th-century elections
1406